Mio Technology Corporation, a subsidiary of MiTAC International Corporation, is a Taiwanese electronics maker that manufactures and markets pocket PCs, personal digital assistants (PDAs), smartphones and personal navigation devices (PNDs).  It sells products under the "Navman" and "Mio" brands.

Mio Technology currently has operations in Taiwan, China, Japan, South Korea, Australia, New Zealand, and Europe. Mio Technology is among the world's top three personal navigation device vendors, which also includes TomTom International BV and Garmin Ltd. Currently they make car and bicycle navigation units and dashboard cameras.

Products 
Several Mio DigiWalker (C720t, C520 and C320) and Mio Moov (A470, A430, 370, 360 and 300) devices include traffic message channel (TMC).

Portable car navigation 
 C7xx Series: C710, C720, C720t, C728
 C5xx Series: C510, C510E, C520, C520t
 C3xx Series: C310, C310s, C310x, C310sx, C320
 C2xx Series: C210, C210s, C220, C230, C250

The new range is the Mio Moov and the Mio Moov Spirit.
 Mio Moov range: Moov 150, Moov 200, Moov 210, Moov 300, Moov 310, Moov 330, Moov 360 (EEU only), Moov 370, Moov 500, Moov 510, Moov 550, Moov 580
 Moov Spirit range: Mio Moov Spirit S300 (S305), Mio Moov Spirit S500 (S505) and (S555), Mio Moov Spirit TV (V505) and (V735)
 Spirit 2010 Range: Mio Spirit 470, Mio Spirit 475, Mio Spirit 575.
There were variants produced for spot deals and limited runs.
 Spirit Range 2011: Mio Spirit 380, Mio Spirit 480, 485, 486, Mio Spirit 680, 685, 686, 687, 688
 Spirit Range 2013: Mio Spirit 490LM, 495LM, 497LM, Mio Spirit 695lm, 697lm, 697LM with truck routing features

PDA navigation 
 DigiWalker series (especially 168 and 180)
 Axx Series: A201
 Pxx Series: P350, P550, P360, P560

GPS PDA Phone 
 Axx Series: A501, A502, A700, A701, A702

Handheld navigation 
 Hxx Series: H610

Smartphones 
 8xxx Series: 8380, 8390

Mio A700/A701 
This model was one of the most popular Mio-branded products, since at its launch in 2006 it was one of the few on the market that combined GPS functions with a GSM phone.
 CPU: Intel PXA 270, 520 MHz
 Display: 16 bit TFT, 320x240 pixels
 GPS receiver: SiRFstarIII
 Expansion slots: SD/MMC (SDIO compatible)

Mio C310x 
 Accuracy (feet) < 9.8
 Voice-guided commands
 Compass
 Display: 3.5" Touch-screen
 Memory: 1GB ROM, 64MB RAM, expandable
 MP3 playback
 Battery life : Up to 5 hours
 Dimensions : 4.3 x 3.0 x 0.8 inches
 Weight: 6 oz

Mio C720t 
The C720t is a cumulative development on previous models of Mio Technology. This model has a 2-mega-pixel camera allowing the user to create their own points of interest (POI). The camera takes the picture of the destination and navigates back to it when needed. This camera also has  business card recognition software, which detects the card and stores its information in the contacts folder of the device.

Besides the new camera, the C720t comes complete with full media powers (pictures, video, and music), as well as Bluetooth capabilities. Mio provides for over 12 million POI's, more than any other companies at this time (October 2007). Available with this is the Traffic Messaging Channel (TMC) which detects and notifies upcoming traffic and helps the driver navigate around it.

Mio S495 LM 
Mio S495 LM was launched in 2013 as the  mid-top range model for the Spirit series. It comes with Spirit software and maps of all the European countries. The device has the LM extension which means that it can update maps free of charge anytime you need. The S495LM comes equipped with the same Samsung CPU of 400 MHz present in 2012 models as well, and has a working memory of 128 MHz. As for the premium functions of this device it has: TMC, parking assistance and multiple route choice. Maps from the Tele Atlas provider are used which offer great coverage of most European countries but are less detailed in Eastern Europe. For instance in countries such as Romania or the Ukraine some county roads and roundabouts – that have been there for a year or two - are missing.

Knight Rider GPS 
Mio created a GPS that features the voice of William Daniels, who played KITT in the hit 1980s television show Knight Rider. It has two LED lights on each side that are in sync with KITT's voice. The product was released on 24 September 2008 at RadioShack to coincide with the season premiere of the new Knight Rider series.

References 

 Mio Technology Limited Becoming Senior Sponsor of Expo 2010 Shanghai
 Mio Launches Sponsorship Website to Celebrate 100 Days to World Expo 2010
 Mio to Unveil Moov V780 at CeBIT
 The Future of GPS? Mio GPS Adds DTV
 Mio Technology Announces New TV PNDs, GPS Phones and Litepad Series Netbooks at Computex 2009
 Mio Technology and Magellan Brands to Coexist in the US Following MiTAC Purchase
 Mio intros four PNDs with new Spirit interface at CES
 Mio Spirit To Hit CES 2009
 Mio intros four PNDs with new Spirit interface at CES

External links 
 Mio Technology Limited
 Mio Corporate Blog 
 Mio Facebook Fans Page
 Mio Technology Europe
 Knight Rider GPS by Mio

Taiwanese companies established in 2002
Companies based in Taipei
Navigation system companies
Mobile phone manufacturers
Electronics companies established in 2002
Taiwanese brands
Electronics companies of Taiwan